William Fallon could refer to:

William H. Fallon, former mayor of St. Paul, Minnesota
William J. Fallon (born 1944), United States Navy admiral
William J. Fallon (attorney) (1886–1937), American criminal defense attorney